"What a Diff'rence a Day Made", also recorded as "What a Difference a Day Makes", is a popular song originally written in Spanish by María Grever, a Mexican songwriter, in 1934 with the title "Cuando vuelva a tu lado" ("When I Return to Your Side") and first recorded by Orquesta Pedro Vía that same year. A popular version in Spanish was later recorded by trio Los Panchos with Eydie Gormé in 1964.  

The song is also known in English as "What a Diff'rence a Day Makes", as popularized by Dinah Washington in 1959.

English adaptation
The English lyrics were written by Stanley Adams, and was played by Harry Roy & his Orchestra. It was published in late 1934.  The most successful early recording, in 1934, was by the Dorsey Brothers, although it was first recorded in English by Cleveland crooner Jimmy Ague.

Dinah Washington version
Dinah Washington won a Grammy Award in 1959 for Best Rhythm and Blues Performance with this song.  Her version was also inducted into the Grammy Hall of Fame in 1998. It also earned her first top ten pop hit, reaching number 8 on the Billboard Hot 100.

Charts

Esther Phillips version
In 1975, Esther Phillips recorded her version of the song.  Her comeback record had a disco feel to it.  The Esther Phillips version reached number two on the disco charts.  Her version also did well on the US soul and Top 40 charts. Phillips performed the song on Saturday Night Live, during its first season.

Charts

Other versions
Andy Russell, a Mexican-American singer, recorded a bilingual version of the song in 1944 (Capitol #167, paired with "Don't You Notice Anything New?"), which reached number 15 on the Billboard Hot 100 chart.
Alfredo Antonini and his orchestra collaborated with Victoria Cordova and John Serry Sr. to record the song for Muzak in 1949.
Vaughn Monroe's 1955 version reached number 60 in the US Music Vendor survey.
Dean Martin covered it in his album Dino Latino in 1962.
Ben E. King covered the song on his album Ben E. King Sings for Soulful Lovers in 1962.
Little Anthony and the Imperials on their album Goin' Out Of My Head (1964).
Bobby Darin's version of the song is on his album Winners, released in 1964, although he recorded it in 1960.
Iris Chacon performed the English language version of the song in a musical number for the 1977 Spanish film "La mujer es un buen negocio".
Australian group The Black Sorrows released a version as their debut single in 1984. It was included on their debut studio album, Sonola.
An instrumental version featuring keyboardist Clare Fischer on piano with strings arranged by Jorge Calandrelli was recorded by Etore Stratta and The Royal Philharmonic Orchestra on their 1993 album Symphonic Boleros.
Jacky Terrasson included the song in his 1994 self-titled album.
Randy Crawford recorded the song on her 1995 album Naked And True.
The Temptations For Lovers Only 1995.
Natalie Cole recorded the song on her 1996 album Stardust, and later in 2013 a bilingual Spanish/English version was included as an iTunes bonus track of her album Natalie Cole en Español.
It was recorded by Diana Ross in 1972, but not released until thirty-four years later when her Blue album was discovered in the Motown vaults and released in 2006.
Barry Manilow recorded the song on his 2006 album The Greatest Songs of the Fifties.
In 2007 R&B/Dance singer Deborah Cox recorded the song for her album Destination Moon. Also in 2007, former Kiss drummer, Peter Criss, covered the song on his album One for All.
Deana Martin recorded “What a Difference a Day Made” on her 2009 album Volare.
China Moses covered the song with Raphael Lemonnier in 2009 in their album This One's for Dinah in 2009.
Rod Stewart - Fly Me to the Moon... The Great American Songbook - Volume V (2010)
In 2021, artist and songwriter, SHELLS and producer Robin Pearkes (aka PALMR) recorded an English version entitled "What a Difference a Day Makes". It was commissioned for the UK's National Health Service (NHS).
Lonnie Johnson covered the song on his album Losing Game.
Julie Dawn and Roy Marsh and His Swingtette released a version of the track paired with "I am Going to Love That Guy" (this track bringing together Julie Dawn and Frank Deniz and His Spirits of Rhythm). The exact release date unknown at the moment (Decca 8034 Matrix numbers I 1320 and I 1322).
Paul Pata - sa guitare et son quintette, on the album Week-End aux Puces, as the instrumental Tous Les Jours Se Ressemblent.
 Other artists who covered the song include 
 Sarah Vaughan, 
 Renee Olstead, 
 Aretha Franklin on her 1964 album, Unforgettable: A Tribute to Dinah Washington, 
 Eydie Gormé on the 1964 album Eydie Gormé canta en Español con Los Panchos, 
 Freddy Fender recorded a version for his 1976 LP If You're Ever in Texas,  
 Bobby Lewis (released on the single “Ace of Hearts 7622” in 1977), 
 Cher performs the song in The Cher Show, 
 Luis Miguel on his 1991 album Romance, 
 Laura Fygi on The Latin Touch (2000), 
 Jamie Cullum on his 2003 album, Twentysomething, 
 Brazilian band Eldissa in their 2005 album "What A Difference...", 
 Gloria Estefan on her 2013 album, The Standards.

In popular culture
The song, as performed by Dinah Washington, is used in the soundtrack of the following films:
 Waves, directed by Trey Edward Shults (2019)
 Going in Style, directed by Zach Braff (2017)
 Niagara Motel, directed by Gary Yates (2005)
 The Best of Youth, directed by Marco Tullio Giordana (2003)
 Run Lola Run, directed by Tom Tykwer (1998)
 Faithful, directed by Paul Mazursky (1996)
 Casino, directed by Martin Scorsese (1995)
 Chungking Express, directed by Wong Kar-wai (1994)
 Corrina, Corrina, directed by Jessie Nelson (1994)
The song, performed by Tony Bennett, is in the film One Fine Day (1996), starring George Clooney.
The song, performed by Esther Phillips, is used at the end of the 1996 film The Sunchaser, directed by Michael Cimino, starring Woody Harrelson.

References

1934 songs
1959 singles
Dinah Washington songs
The Black Sorrows songs
Songs written by Stanley Adams (singer)
Boleros
Mercury Records singles